Devrekani is a town in the Kastamonu Province in the Black Sea region of Turkey. It is the seat of Devrekani District. Its population is 5,763 (2021).

References

External links
 A detailed map of Devrekani district 

Populated places in Kastamonu Province
Devrekani District
Towns in Turkey